Leptobrachella oshanensis, also known as the Oshan metacarpal-tubercled toad or pigmy crawl frog, is a frog species in the family Megophryidae. It is endemic to southern–central China (Guizhou, Hubei, Gansu, and Sichuan provinces as well as the municipality of Chongqing). Its type locality is Mount Emei. The same mountain has given the species its name.  It has also been reported from Thailand and Laos but these are now considered to represent Leptobrachella minimus.

It is not considered threatened by the IUCN.

References

oshanensis
Frogs of China
Endemic fauna of China
Amphibians described in 1950
Taxonomy articles created by Polbot